Hacıqərvənd (also, Gadzhi-Karvend and Gadzhykarvend) is a village and municipality in the Tartar Rayon of Azerbaijan.  It has a population of 2,592.

References 

Populated places in Tartar District